National College, Bangalore is the name given to two sister institutions in Bangalore, India: the National College Basavanagudi, founded in 1920, and the National College, Jayanagar, founded in 1965. Other related institutions, also called National College, are located in Bagepalli (Chikkaballapur District) and Gowribidanur. These institutions are managed by the National Education Society of Karnataka (NES).

National College (autonomous) Basavanagudi
National College Basavanagudi is located in Basavanagudi. It was started in the year 1920. The college was founded by Sampath Giri Rao.

Educationalist Dr. H. Narasimhaiah was the chairman of NES until his death. He also started the Bangalore Science Forum (BSF).

National College (autonomous), Jayanagar
The National College in Jayanagar was started in 1965. It offers courses at both pre-university and degree levels in the arts and sciences including English, Kannada, Sanskrit, French, Hindi, physics, computer science, electronics, psychology, mathematics, chemistry, botany, and zoology.

The college is known for following Gandhian principles and was founded by educationalist H. Narasimhiah, a Gandhian himself and Padma Bhushan recipient.

The college has Dr. H.N. Kalakshetra on its premises who is linked with Bangalore Lalitha Kala Parishat. The college features the B.V. Jagadeesh Science Centre, a public institution open to anyone interested in science education, established with the hope that the younger generation will make the best use of it.

Notable alumni

Notable alumni of either of the two colleges include: 
 C. N. R. Rao
 Kalya Jagannath Rao
 Anil Kumble
 Vishnuvardhan
 Ramesh Aravind
 Srinath
 Vinayak Joshi
 Nicole Rodrigues-Larsen
 EAS Prasanna
 Pavan Kumar
 A.S Kiran Kumar
 Srinivas BV
 BN Narayana – Makeup Nani, husband of Bhargavi Narayan
 Divya Gokulnath – Entrepreneur and Co-Founder, Byjus

See also
 National High School, Basavanagudi

External links
 Official website of the National College, Basavanagudi
 Report on National College, Basavangudi by NAAC: accredited "B+"
 Report on National College, Jayanagar by NAAC: accredited "B"

Colleges in Bangalore